Purpendicular is the fifteenth studio album by the English rock band Deep Purple, released in 1996. It is their first album with guitarist Steve Morse from Dixie Dregs, who replaced Ritchie Blackmore.

Recording
The album was recorded at Greg Rike Productions, Orlando, Florida from February to October 1995 and engineered by Darren Schneider and Keith Andrews. It had a more experimental approach than previous albums. The arrangement to "The Aviator", employed an acoustic folk/country arrangement that had not been heard on the band's previous work since "Anyone's Daughter" from Fireball. Several of the songs such as "Vavoom: Ted the Mechanic" featured less keyboard, focusing on guitar. Morse introduced pinch harmonics to the band's sound, such as on "Vavoom: Ted the Mechanic" and "Somebody Stole My Guitar". "Sometimes I Feel Like Screaming" and "Vavoom: Ted the Mechanic" remained regular features in Deep Purple's live setlist in recent tours.

Like the title of the band's following album, Abandon, Purpendicular is a pun; in this case, based on the band's name and the word "Perpendicular".

Track listing

Personnel
Deep Purple
Ian Gillan – lead vocals, harmonica
Steve Morse – guitars, backing vocals
Jon Lord – keyboards
Roger Glover – bass
Ian Paice – drums

Production
Darren Schneider, Keith Andrews – engineers, mixing at Parc Studios, Orlando, Florida
Adam Barber – assistant engineer
Greg Calbi – mastering at Masterdisk, New York

Charts

References

Deep Purple albums
1996 albums
CMC International albums
RCA Records albums